Royal City is a city in Grant County, Washington, United States. The population was 1,776 at the 2020 census.

History
Royal City was founded in 1956 and officially incorporated on February 14, 1962. The townsite was previously named Royal Flats, and the entire area Royal Slope, thus the name Royal City. During the 1960s, there was a Titan I ICBM silo located near the town. The Royal Slope was named Washington state's 15th designated wine growing region (AVA - American Viticultural Area) on September 2, 2020.

Today, this small farming community is most known for producing a wide variety of crops, thanks to a long growing season. Apples, cherries, peaches, timothy and alfalfa hay, melons, potatoes, onions, wine grapes, pears, mint and corn are grown in this area. The Royal slope area is a popular place for birders, hunters, and golfers as well.

The Royal Knights (Royal High School) have won division 1A state football titles in 1996, 2000, 2004, 2005, 2007, 2015, 2016, 2017, 2019, 2021, and 2022.
The Royal High Knight mascot and colors, black and gold, were selected by the ASB class officers of 1965.

Geography
Royal City is located at  (46.901899, -119.627220).

Demographics

2010 census
As of the census of 2010, there were 2,140 people, 486 households, and 439 families living in the city. The racial makeup of the city was 45.7% White, 1.2% African American, 0.8% Native American, 0.9% Asian, 48.7% from other races, and 2.7% from two or more races. Hispanic or Latino of any race were 88.7% of the population.

There were 486 households, of which 72.2% had children under the age of 18 living with them, 62.1% were married couples living together, 11.5% had a female householder with no husband present, 16.7% had a male householder with no wife present, and 9.7% were non-families. 4.9% of all households were made up of individuals, and 2% had someone living alone who was 65 years of age or older. The average household size was 4.26 and the average family size was 4.20.

The median age in the city was 22.4 years. 40.1% of residents were under the age of 18; 14.7% were between the ages of 18 and 24; 30.6% were from 25 to 44; 11.8% were from 45 to 64; and 2.9% were 65 years of age or older. The gender makeup of the city was 53.3% male and 46.7% female.

2000 census
As of the census of 2000, there were 1,823 people, 444 households, and 380 families living in the city. The population density was 1,445.6 people per square mile (558.6/km2). There were 504 housing units at an average density of 399.7 per square mile (154.4/km2). The racial makeup of the city was 66.32% White, 0.38% African American, 0.38% Native American, 0.55% Asian, 29.90% from other races, and 2.47% from two or more races. Hispanic or Latino of any race were 78.22% of the population.

There were 444 households, out of which 64.6% had children under the age of 18 living with them, 67.3% were married couples living together, 8.8% had a female householder with no husband present, and 14.4% were non-families. 10.6% of all households were made up of individuals, and 5.9% had someone living alone who was 65 years of age or older. The average household size was 4.10 and the average family size was 4.33.

In the city, the population was spread out, with 40.3% under the age of 18, 12.4% from 18 to 24, 31.9% from 25 to 44, 11.0% from 45 to 64, and 4.4% who were 65 years of age or older. The median age was 24 years. For every 100 females, there were 126.2 males. For every 100 females age 18 and over, there were 132.0 males.

The median income for a household in the city was $28,529, and the median income for a family was $29,821. Males had a median income of $19,643 versus $22,917 for females. The per capita income for the city was $9,502. About 24.0% of families and 26.7% of the population were below the poverty line, including 35.0% of those under age 18 and 7.9% of those age 65 or over.

References

Cities in Grant County, Washington
Cities in Washington (state)